The Redlands Santa Fe Depot District is a historic commercial district located in downtown Redlands. The district is centered on Redlands' Santa Fe Railway depot, which was established in 1888. The current station building, a Classical Revival structure, was built in 1909–10 to replace the original depot and lost passenger service in 1938. The buildings surrounding the station represent many of the important components of the city's economy, particularly the orange packing industry. Several packing houses remain from the city's heyday as an orange packing center, forming one of the largest remaining groups of orange packing houses in the Inland Empire. A number of the other buildings were used by growers' associations and other groups in the citrus industry. The district also includes three buildings from the city's historic Chinatown, which thrived from the 1880s through the 1920s after Chinese immigrants came to Redlands to build the railroad.

The district was added to the National Register of Historic Places on October 29, 1991, and the California Points of Historical Interest.

The depot was purchased from Krikorian Theatres founder George Krikorian by a real estate development company with ties to Esri executives in September 2017. (Esri is also funding a train station next to its nearby headquarters.) Due to the new ownership, the depot may be restored and integrated with the under construction adjacent Redlands–Downtown Arrow rail station.

References

External links

Redlands Santa Fe Railway Station at the Redlands Area Historical Society
Being Restored: the Santa Fe Depot, Redlands, California at Urban Decay

Railway stations on the National Register of Historic Places in California
National Register of Historic Places in San Bernardino County, California
Neoclassical architecture in California
Historic districts on the National Register of Historic Places in California
Buildings and structures in Redlands, California
History of Redlands, California
1991 establishments in California
1888 establishments in California
1910 establishments in California
Railway stations in the United States opened in 1910
Railway stations in the United States opened in 1888
Railway stations in San Bernardino County, California
Railway stations closed in 1938
1938 disestablishments in California
Former Atchison, Topeka and Santa Fe Railway stations in California